Tacs or TACS may refer to:

 Training Assessment and Certification Scheme, the IRATA International training scheme for rope access technicians
 Total Access Communication System, a mostly-obsolete version of the AMPS mobile phone system formerly used in some European countries
 Theater Air Control System, the US Air Force's system of ground-based and airborne command and control elements for planning, executing, monitoring, and directing combat air operations
 Transcranial Alternating Current Stimulation (tACS), a non-invasive brain stimulation technique
 Total Anterior Circulation Stroke Syndrome, symptoms of a patient who appears to have suffered a total anterior circulation infarct, but who has not yet had any diagnostic imaging to confirm the diagnosis
 Tacs, the Hungarian name for Tonciu village, Galații Bistriței Commune, Bistriţa-Năsăud County, Romania